Oh Happy Day is the third studio album by the Statler Brothers and the last one recorded for Columbia Records. "O Happy Day" was the lone single.

Track listing
"O Happy Day" (Edwin Hawkins)
"How Great Thou Art" (Carl Boberg)
"King of Love" (Harold Reid)
"Are You Washed in the Blood" (Traditional; arranged by The Statler Bros.)
"Pass Me Not" (Traditional; arranged by The Statler Bros.)
Daddy Sang Bass (Carl Perkins)
"Less of Me" (Glen Campbell)
"The Things God Gave Me" (Don Reid)
"Led Out of Bondage" (Robert L. Prather)
"Just in Time" (Jerry Lee Lewis)
"The Fourth Man" (Arthur Smith)

References

External links
 Statler Discography

1969 albums
Columbia Records albums
The Statler Brothers albums